Khandas is a small village in the Raigad district, of Maharashtra, India, approximately 100 km from Mumbai and roughly 34 km from Karjat station.

The village is situated in the foothills of Bhimashanker Hills a popular spot for treks closest to Mumbai.  

Khandas is a small village in Maharashtra India approximately 34 km from Karjat station.  

It is the starting point for the trek to Bhimashanker. It takes approximately 4 hours to reach Bhimashanker from Khandas village via Ganesh Ghat which is an easier route.  The other route to Bhimashanker from Khandas is via Sidi Ghat which is a shorter route compared to Ganesh Ghat but quite tough, especially during Monsoon.  Khandas village is in itself a very beautiful place. Regular Taxis, Buses, Three Wheelers etc. are available from Karjat for Khandas. Local guides are also regularly available for Bhimashankar journey.

 

Villages in Raigad district